Events in the year 1776 in Norway.

Incumbents
Monarch: Christian VII

Events
15 January – A Danish-Norwegian Nationality Act reserves state offices for Norwegian, Danish and Holstein citizens.
Blaafarveværket, a mining and industrial company in Modum, was established.

Arts and literature

Spind Church was built.

Births
9 August - Jacob Munch, painter and military officer (died 1839)

Full date unknown
Jens Gasmann, businessperson and politician (died 1850)
Poul Christian Holst, politician and Minister (died 1863)
Hilmar Meincke Krohg, politician (died 1851)

Deaths
 Henrik Bech, woodcarver (born c.1718).

See also

References